Dubonnet is a sweet, aromatised wine-based quinquina, often enjoyed as an aperitif. It is a blend of fortified wine, herbs, and spices (including a small amount of quinine), with fermentation being stopped by the addition of alcohol. It is currently produced in France by Pernod Ricard, and in the United States by Heaven Hill Distilleries of Bardstown, Kentucky. The French made version is 14.8% alcohol by volume and the US version 19%. The beverage is famous in the UK for having been the favourite drink of Queen Elizabeth II and Queen Elizabeth The Queen Mother.

In November 2021, Dubonnet was awarded a Royal Warrant by Queen Elizabeth II.

Ingredients 

Four main ingredients are used:
 Red Wine Base: distinct blend of grapes – Ruby Red, Ruby Cabernet and Muscat of Alexandria
 Herbs and spices: blackcurrant, essence of tea varietals, and other ingredients
 Cinchona bark: original medicinal ingredient derived from bark of the cinchona tree, produces  a dry tannin note
 Cane sugar: 100% cane sugar.

History

Dubonnet was first sold in 1846 by Joseph Dubonnet, in response to a competition run by the French Government to find a way of persuading French Foreign Legionnaires in North Africa to drink quinine. Quinine combats malaria but is very bitter.

Ownership was taken over by Pernod Ricard in 1976. It was re-popularised in the late 1970s by an advertising campaign starring Pia Zadora. It is available in Rouge, Blanc and Gold (vanilla and orange) varieties. Dubonnet is also widely known by the advertisement slogan of the French graphic designer Cassandre "Dubo, Dubon, Dubonnet" (a play on words roughly meaning "It's nice; it's good; it's Dubonnet"), which still can be found on the walls of houses in France. The brand later became owned by Heaven Hill.

Dubonnet is commonly mixed with lemonade or bitter lemon, and forms part of many cocktails.

Reputedly Dubonnet is a favourite beverage of:
 Queen Elizabeth The Queen Mother, who liked gin and Dubonnet: 30% gin, 70% Dubonnet with a slice of lemon under the ice. She once noted before a trip, "I think that I will take two small bottles of Dubonnet and gin with me this morning, in case it is needed."
 Queen Elizabeth II, who liked 66% Dubonnet and 33% gin with two cubes of ice and a lemon slice before lunch every day.
 Nelson Rockefeller, whose taste for alcohol was moderate, would have an occasional glass of Dubonnet on the rocks.

Cocktails 
The following include Dubonnet as one of their ingredients:

 The Alfonso
 Apple Dubonnet
 Arnaud's Special (New Orleans)
 Bartender
 Bentley
 Blackthorn Cocktail
 Dot-Roy
 Dubonnet Cassis
 Dubonnet Cocktail
 Dubonnet Daniella
 Dubonnet Delight
 Dubonnet Fizz
 Dubonnet Helado
 Dubonnet Highball
 Dubonnet Kiss
 Dubonnet Manhattan
 Dubonnet Negroni
 Dubonnet Royal
 Dubonnet TT
 Jack London Martini
 Opera Cocktail
 Phoebe Snow 
 Red Moonlight
 Rum Dubonnet
 San Diego Cocktail
 Savoy Hotel Special
 Trois Rivieres
 Mummy Love
 Marble Hill
 Napoleon
 Karl-Gerhard
 Bossunova Belt
 Magic Juice
 The Queen Mother
 The Mexican

See also
 Gin and tonic, another drink invented to encourage European colonial soldiers in South Asian tropical climates to take quinine.

References

External links
 Dubonnet on the Pernod-Ricard website
 The Dubonnet website

Aromatised wine
Pernod Ricard brands
Products introduced in 1846